Sreenidhi Tirumala (born 26 January 1990), is an Indian Carnatic musician, Playback singer and Music director. Sreenidhi performed in major sabhas in India and presented her concerts in many destinations around the world. She received multiple awards and honours. Sreenidhi trained under vocal stalwart Nedunuri Krishnamurthy.

Early life and family 
Sreenidhi was born in Anantapur. Her father T. Subramanyacharyulu is Carnatic Vocalist and Violinist and her mother T. Sarada is Carnatic Musician. She got her initial training by her mother as she used to sing Thyagaraja krithis and ragaalapanams, swarams in place of lullabies to the just born Sreenidhi. Her father, who is a vocal-violin exponent, nurtured her with a good authentic musical foundation. Later she trained under legendary vocal stalwart Sangita Kalanidhi Dr. Nedunuri Krishnamurthy. She is married to Venkatesh on 26 January 2015 at Hyderabad.

Career 
Sreenidhi's uncanny musical talent was discovered at a very young age of 11months. She could identify raagas and could notate any phrase of music, let it be a complex sangathi in carnatic music or a simple keychain tune. Her rare knowledge at such young age astonished both the musicians and common public. Performing career began at a very young age of 2 and half years, and it was a wonder to everyone's eyes who witnessed a baby not only notating any alaap or phrase in any raagam and recognizing the name of the raagam but also performing raagaalapanam and swarakalpanam to krithis with her Manodharmam (extempore).
Right from her childhood, Sreenidhi had a habit of listening to legendary senior artists, which made her understand different baanis (styles). The encouragement and guidance from her parents made her music appreciation attain contemplative quality. Sreenidhi's perception towards music was very much influenced by her Guru Sri. Nedunuri Krishnamurthy, after coming under his tutelage.

Discography

Compositions

Competitions
 Raga Ranjani, the team formed and led by Sreenidhi, won the title of the prestigious Bhajan Samraat Season-2, a unique talent show on Nama sankeerthanam conducted by Sri Sankara TV
 Title winner of Idea Super Singer - 1 and Idea Super Singer -3 series, Paadalani Undhi conducted by MAA TV
 Won the prestigious Dikshithar Tambura prize in Kalasagaram for the year 2011
 Sreenidhi's talent has been recorded in “Guinness Book Of World Records” at a very young age of 3 years
 Sri Akkineni Nageswara Rao had presented the LIimca Award in Sri Thyagaraja Gana Sabha in Hyderabad, when her talent was recorded in Limca book of records on 16-09-1992.
 Madras Telugu academy felicitated Sreenidhi by giving UGADI PURASKAR awarded on 21-3-1993. 
 On the children's day on 14-11-1992 she had been awarded with BALA RATHNA and was presented with GOLD MEDAL by the honorable chief minister of Andhrapradesh.

References

http://m.thehindu.com/features/friday-review/music/t-srinidhi-demonstrated-her-experience-in-a-concert-dedicated-to-nedunuri-krishnamurthy/article8025591.ece
https://www.youtube.com/channel/UCDcykIxXVO0gOlIMXzJvJFA/feed
http://www.thehindu.com/todays-paper/tp-features/tp-metroplus/the-winning-tune/article5527423.ece
http://www.manatelugu.in/singer-sree-nidhi-in-coffee-with/
http://www.sreenidhimusic.com/
http://www.medhanet.com/tfas/srinidhi.html
http://www.cutmirchi.com/view/detail/47799/Singer-Srinidhi-Engagement-Stills

http://m.raaga.com/telugu/album/Tippu-songs-A0003493
http://www.cineradham.com/newsongs/song.php?movieid=3022
http://m.raaga.com/telugu/album/Idi-Mamulu-Prema-Katha-Kadu-A0002923
http://www.filmibeat.com/telugu/movies/idi-mamulu-prema-katha-kadu.html
http://m.raaga.com/telugu/album/Telugammye-songs-A0002774

1990 births
Living people
Telugu playback singers
People from Anantapur, Andhra Pradesh
Indian women singers
21st-century Indian singers
21st-century Indian women singers
Women Carnatic singers
Carnatic singers
Singers from Andhra Pradesh